Adishi Glacier is a valley glacier located in the central part of the Greater Caucasus Mountain Range in the Svaneti Region of Georgia. The glacier lies on the southern slopes of the Caucasus. The glacier feeds off of the runoff and ice flows from the adjacent glaciers that are located on the southern slopes of Tetnuldi, Gistola and Lakutsia. The Adishi Glacier is the source of the river Adishischala. The glacier takes its name from the nearby village Adishi.

See also
Mount Adishi
Glaciers of Georgia

References 
 Georgian State (Soviet) Encyclopedia. 1975. Book 1. p. 96.

Glaciers of Georgia (country)
Svaneti